The Miner's Daughter is a 1927 Australian silent film set in Sydney and Bendigo. Little is known about it and it is considered a lost film.

Production
It was directed by a Polish photographer, art director and film producer, Leon Forbert, who was visiting Australia in the late 1920s. The star was boxer Bert McCarthy, Australia's featherweight champion at the time. Finance was allegedly provided by members of Melbourne's Jewish community.

Release
A. R. Harwood distributed the movie but had little success.

Bert McCarthy died in 1931 after being knocked unconscious during a fight. Ten years previously boxer Denico Cabanella had died after a fight with McCarthy.

References

External links

The Miner's Daughter at National Film and Sound Archive

1927 films
Australian drama films
Australian silent films
Australian black-and-white films
1927 drama films
Lost Australian films
1927 lost films
Lost drama films
Silent drama films